The Network Centric Airborne Defense Element (NCADE) is an anti-ballistic missile system being developed by Raytheon for the Missile Defense Agency. On Sept. 18, 2008 Raytheon announced it had been awarded a $10 million contract to continue NCADE research and development. The NCADE system is a boost phase interceptor based heavily on the AIM-120 AMRAAM, with the AMRAAM fragmentation warhead replaced by a hit-to-kill vehicle powered by a hydroxylammonium nitrate monopropellant rocket motor from Aerojet.

The launch vehicle will be a Boeing F-15C Golden Eagle with an AESA radar.

References 

Anti-ballistic missiles of the United States
Air-to-air missiles of the United States
Raytheon Company products